Qamrul Hoda is an Indian politician. Belonging to Rastriya Janta Dal, he was elected as a member of the Bihar Legislative Assembly for Kishanganj on 24 October 2019.

References

Living people
Bihar MLAs 2015–2020
All India Majlis-e-Ittehadul Muslimeen politicians
Year of birth missing (living people)